Hare Ribbin' is a 1944 animated short film in the Merrie Melodies series, directed by Robert Clampett and featuring Bugs Bunny. The plot features Bugs' conflict with a red-haired hound dog, whom the rabbit sets out to evade and make a fool of using one-liners, reverse psychology, disguises and other tricks. It was released in theaters by Warner Bros. on June 24, 1944. The title is a pun on "hair ribbon".

It is also the first Warner Bros. cartoon to include Bugs' head in the opening title sequence.

Plot 
The short opens with a dog with a Russian accent (a la Bert Gordon's "Mad Russian") hunting for a rabbit by sniffing a trail. He happens upon Bugs who begins to torment the dog, after the dog sniffs Bugs' armpit and makes the foghorn noise used in radio commercials for Lifebuoy (soap) to warn against "B.O." (body odor). This prompts a chase, which leads to a nearby lake where the rest of the story continues. The rest of the action takes place underwater.

Eventually, after a few gags, with Bugs dressed up as a mermaid, playing tag with the canine, and disguising himself as Elmer Fudd, the dog corners Bugs and demands he gives him a rabbit sandwich. Bugs obliges, and the rabbit places himself between two giant slices of loaf bread with his legs curled next to his body. The dog takes a bite and Bugs screams and fakes his death. The dog becomes instantly grief-stricken and sobs, declaring that he should be the one to die. With this statement, Bugs springs back to life asking, "Ehhhh...do you mean it?", and obliges the dog's death wish (see Censorship and alternative endings below). The dog falls to the ground, Bugs plants a flower on his chest and dances away into the distance. As the cartoon is about to "iris-out" the dog sits up (revealing that he is still alive), holds the closing iris before it closes, and declares "This shouldn't even happen to a dog!". He then lets the iris go, but it closes on his nose in the process, making him yelp in pain.

Analysis 
Michael S. Shull and David E. Wilt consider it ambiguous if this cartoon contain a World War II-related reference. While underwater, Bugs disguises himself as a mermaid. The dog transforms into a torpedo to pursue "her".

The two alternate versions of the ending were based on the perception of someone that Bugs could not be seen killing another animal. This someone was perhaps a studio administrator.

Censorship and alternative endings 
 This cartoon short holds the distinction of having two endings, both of which are too violent by today's standards to be shown on children/family-friendly television. In both endings, the Willoughby-esque Russian Dog, distraught over Bugs' "death" and guilt-ridden, wishes he were dead too. Bugs then quotes the Mad Russian, saying, "eh, do you mean it?" After that scene comes one of two different scenarios:

The original theatrical ending: Bugs hands a gun to the canine so he can shoot himself in the head—once played in theaters to a general audience, is now commonly cut from television versions on network and cable TV, although it has aired uncensored (as recently as 2015) on the Canadian cable channel Teletoon Retro.  It has also aired on May 1, 2020 on Australian Foxtel cable channel, Boomerang. This ending was also aired uncensored on an episode of Cartoon Network's The Bob Clampett Show, as well as the Cartoon Network's New Year's Day Looney Tunes marathons in 2009 and 2010. The edit occurs between the scene where Bugs says "Do you mean it?" and the dog lying down, making it seem as if the dog had dropped dead out of guilt without shooting himself.

The "director's cut" ending: Bugs pulls out a gun, shooting the dog through the mouth. Bugs then dances away, and the dog gets up to deliver the last line: "This shouldn't happen to a dog." was never shown in theaters or on television, despite that the episode of Cartoon Network's The Bob Clampett Show that aired "Hare Ribbin'" with its general release ending mentioned that "Hare Ribbin'" had an alternate ending (this one) that was never shown, and due to its violence, never will be. The director's cut version was first discovered on the fifth volume of the laserdisc set of "The Golden Age of Looney Tunes Volume 5" and the entire cartoon with the director's cut part is now on the fifth volume of the Looney Tunes Golden Collection DVD set as a special feature.

Other scenes included in the director's cut is an extended scene of the Dog sniffing for Bugs in the beginning of the film. Also when the dog turns around and sees Bugs in his mermaid costume, in the original cut the Dog turns into a torpedo right when Bugs whistles at him. The director's cut adds a scene where the dog starts heavy breathing (actually a piece of recycled animation from "The Hep Cat", with the cat from the cartoon redrawn into the dog) before turning into a torpedo, with an extended version of them playing tag.

One scene that is not used in the director's cut is when Bugs is moving his body up in the bread so he is not actually eaten by the dog. Based on the slight difference in animation style from the rest of the film, both this and the scene when Bugs hands him the gun appear to be re-shoots, added before the theatrical release.

Home media
The Golden Age of Looney Tunes Volume 5 laserdisc set has the "director's cut" version of this cartoon, unrestored. The fifth volume of the Looney Tunes Golden Collection DVD set has the original cut of Hare Ribbin''', restored and remastered, and the director's cut as a special feature, unrestored and unremastered (the difference between both cuts can be determined by the tinting of the color).

 Sources 
 Looney Tunes and Merrie Melodies: A Complete Illustrated Guide to the Warner Bros. Cartoons, by Jerry Beck and Will Friedwald (1989), Henry Holt, 
 Looney Tunes Golden Collection'', DVD set.

See also 
 Looney Tunes and Merrie Melodies filmography (1940–1949)

References

External links 
 The CENSORED Looney Tunes and Merrie Melodies Guide
 "It Can't be Wrong" lyrics
 
 

1944 films
1944 short films
1944 animated films
1940s animated short films
Merrie Melodies short films
Warner Bros. Cartoons animated short films
Films directed by Bob Clampett
Films about hunters
Films produced by Leon Schlesinger
Films scored by Carl Stalling
Animated films about dogs
Bugs Bunny films
1940s Warner Bros. animated short films
1944 comedy films
Film controversies
Obscenity controversies in animation
Obscenity controversies in film
Censored films
Self-censorship